Rene Jacques "R. J." Brande is a character appearing in DC Comics, primarily in association with the Legion of Super-Heroes. He first appeared in Adventure Comics #350, and was created by E. Nelson Bridwell.

Fictional history

Pre-Crisis
Originally a Durlan (shapeshifting alien) named Ren Daggle, Brande was frozen in human form by the deadly Yorggian fever. Later it was revealed that Ren and his deceased mate Zhay were the biological parents of Chameleon Boy and his twin, Liggt. After the death of his wife, he leaves the children with Zhay's sister, Ji, and along with his brother-in-law, Theg, leaves Durla. Ren Daggle became R.J. Brande, Theg would become his cousin Doyle Brande (who would later indirectly cause the formation of the Legion by sending assassins after Brande). Permanently in a human form, he amassed a vast fortune by making stars, using advanced technology to create suns for clients. He became one of the richest men in the galaxy, and bought a private planetoid where he built his mansion. His right-hand-man was Marla Latham, who he would later assign to be the Legion's Adult Adviser. He becomes the major financier for the Legion of Super-Heroes, and founded the group with Cosmic Boy, Saturn Girl, and Lightning Lad after they saved his life from Doyle's hired killers on a trip to Earth.  He cared deeply for his Legion "pups", once offering Grimbor the Chainsman his entire fortune to ensure their safety. After Earthwar, when the UP President embezzled his fortune, Brande rejected the offer of reimbursement, and started amassing a new fortune. Shortly thereafter, his parental link with Reep Daggle, Chameleon Boy, was discovered (but not publicly announced). The shock would drive Reep to rash actions which would ultimately lead to a brief incarceration on prison planet Takron-Galtos. While imprisoned, Reep lost his powers due to the high radiation exposure caused by Ol-Vir's super-vision. The pair fully reconciled when father and son returned to Durla to locate the legendary Temple which was said to reinvigorate lost shapeshifting abilities. While Reep eagerly stepped into the cascading energies, Brande refused, stating that he had grown fond of his human form. Months later, he would survive yet another assassination attempt, this time arranged by Leland McCauley IV. This would lead Brande to undertake a long incognito personal odyssey which would last for several years.

Post-Crisis
After the Crisis on Infinite Earths limited series abolished the DC multiverse for a time, he was retconned into a 20th-century Durlan and founding member of the intergalactic police force L.E.G.I.O.N. For a short time he works with such members as Garryn Bek, Vril Dox and Stealth in their early efforts to establish an interplanetary peacekeeping force. He is then brought forward in time to the 30th century by the villainess Glorith; as part of the necessary elements of the transfer, he is switched with the now amnesiac Phantom Girl.

Post-Zero Hour
R. J. Brande now creates stargates instead of suns, but plays much the same role in the Legion's origins. Brande was originally planned to be revealed as the Martian Manhunter, but JLA editor Dan Raspler vetoed the idea. Still, many hints that Brande is J'onn J'onzz exist in Legion comics. Brande eventually becomes President of the United Planets, although he loses the position during the "One Year Gap".

Threeboot
Brande did not appear in "Threeboot" continuity, but Ultra Boy does confront some super-powered punks in Brande Park in Metropolis.

Post-Infinite Crisis
The aftermath of the Infinite Crisis mini-series has restored a close analogue of the pre-Crisis on Infinite Earths Legion to continuity, as seen in "The Lightning Saga" story arc in Justice League of America and Justice Society of America (June–August 2007), and in the "Superman and the Legion of Super-Heroes" story arc in Action Comics (late December 2007-May 2008). The R.J. Brande who founded this version of the Legion was assassinated by economic rival Leland McCauley in Final Crisis: Legion of Three Worlds #1 (October 2008). After his death, he was revealed to be a Durlan who, inspired by ancient books (including texts of Superman's exploits), left Durla for the universe beyond; he is also re-established as Chameleon Boy's biological father.

In Final Crisis: Legion of 3 Worlds #5, Starman has a copy of "The Last Will and Testament of R.J. Brande" in the 21st century. This is revealed over the course of the Superman: New Krypton event, beginning in the lead-up story arc Brainiac and culminating in War of the Supermen, to be instructions for the Legion to prevent the villain Brainiac from altering events in the 21st century to the point that the Legionnaires' future timeline would be negated. An actual will, recorded as a hologram by Brande himself, was later shown to Lightning Lad, Saturn Girl, Cosmic Boy, Chameleon Boy, Brainiac 5, and Superboy, where he explains much of his early history, apologizes to his son for abandoning him on Durla and promises him a significant inheritance, pledges continued financial support for the Legion itself and Brainiac 5's research after his death, and states his pride in what the Legion has accomplished.

In other media
R. J. Brande appears in Legion of Super Heroes, voiced by Lex Lang. This version is a heavyset, mustachioed, wealthy Texan stereotype.

References

External links
 Unofficial R.J Brande Biography

Comics characters introduced in 1966
DC Comics characters
DC Comics characters who are shapeshifters
Fictional businesspeople